Rumbledethumps is a traditional dish from the Scottish Borders. The main ingredients are potato, cabbage and onion. Similar to Irish colcannon and English bubble and squeak, it is either served as an accompaniment to a main dish or as a main dish itself.

Cooked leftovers from a roast meal can be used. However, to make fresh rumbledethumps one needs to lightly sauté the shredded onion and cabbage in butter until the onion is translucent and the cabbage wilted, then add some potatoes mashed with butter, salt and pepper; after thoroughly mixing the ingredients, they are placed into an ovenproof dish, and cheddar (or similar) cheese placed on top, if desired. This is then baked until golden brown on top.

An alternative from Aberdeenshire is called kailkenny.

In popular culture

In January 2009, Gordon Brown submitted a recipe for rumbledethumps to a cookbook for Donaldson's School for the Deaf, describing it as his favourite food.

See also
 Scottish cuisine
 List of cabbage dishes
 List of onion dishes
 List of potato dishes

References

Scottish cuisine
Potato dishes
Cabbage dishes
Baked foods